Tear Along the Dotted Line is a 2021 Italian adult animated series written and directed by cartoonist Zerocalcare. It was released internationally on Netflix on 17 November 2021.

Plot
The series follows Zero, an anxious and socially awkward cartoonist from Rome who reflects on his path in life and a would-be love as he travels to the city of Biella with his friends Sarah and Secco and his armadillo-for-a-conscience. In the initial episodes, Zero imitates the voices of his friends since he himself acts as the narrator and plays all the main roles. Initially Sarah and Zero meet in a seemingly casual way, and as they progress, Zero begins to remember different episodes of his life and his personal relationships with his close friends, especially Alice, on who he had a crush when he was younger. However, they ultimately never began a romantic relationship with each other, instead maintaining a true friendship. Zero and Sarah reunite with Secco to decide how they will travel to Biella. Once they arrive at their destination, they are greeted by a couple of elders who host them in their home. The trio make it clear that they are not entirely comfortable with the situation, but agreed to come to Biella partly out of a need to save money, and partly as a courtesy to the elderly couple, who are revealed to be Alice's parents. At the end of the fifth episode, Secco finally reveals that Alice has died and they are attending her funeral.

The final episode is the only one in which each character speaks with their real voice, since the events are now happening in real time. Zero realizes that Alice also had a crush on him, but their relationship never moved beyond friendship. Alice's parents, Sarah and Zero reflect on what could have motivated a lively and optimistic person like Alice to commit suicide for no clear reason and invite the public to pay more attention to the people around them.

Cast

Zerocalcare as himself. He also dubs all other voices in the first 5 episodes, except Armadillo. He often breaks the fourth wall, directly addressing to the audience, interrupting his own flashbacks to clarify or justify his own mistakes.
Valerio Mastandrea as Armadillo, a giant orange creature that only exists in Zero's mind. He represents his conscience and criticizes everything Zero does.
Chiara Gioncardi as Sarah (episode 6), Zero's best friend since primary school. She dreams of becoming a teacher.
Paolo Vivio as Secco (episode 6), Zero's close friend who dropped out of school to become an online poker player. He is deadpan compared to Zero and Sarah and is seemingly indifferent to the world; however, he has a passion for ice cream, as he suggests going to get some at every opportunity.
Veronica Puccio as Alice (episode 6), Sarah's friend and Zero's crush. A girl who moved to Rome to pursue her dreams of becoming a child educator.
Ambrogio Colombo as Alice's father (episode 6)
Michele Foschini as Guy (episode 6)
Ezio Conenna and Alessandra Sani as additional voices (episode 6)

English cast:
Adam Rhys Dee as Zerocalcare
Wayne Forester as Armadillo
Becky Wright, Ben Elliot, Robert Wilfort as additional voices

Production
On 21 December 2020, Zerocalcare announced that he would be creating an animated series for Netflix titled Tear Along the Dotted Line, his first animated series after having experimented with animation for years. The series is produced by Movimenti Production (A Banijay company) in collaboration with BAO Publishing, DogHead Animation is charged for the animation production while Massimo Cherubin from Rain Frog is sound designer and mixer. Ten months later, on 8 October 2021, Netflix released a teaser trailer for the show. The show premiered on 18 October at the Rome Film Festival and was internationally released via Netflix on 17 November.

Episodes

Soundtrack
The original soundtrack was composed by Giancane and collected in the album Strappati lungo i bordi, released along with the series. Other tracks were chosen by Zerocalcare, including tracks by Billy Idol, Jonathan Lloyd & Clif Norrell, Manu Chao, Band of Horses, Ron, Tiziano Ferro, M83, Max Brodie, Fauve, Gli Ultimi, Klaxon, and Generation X.

Legacy 
In May 2022, BAO Publishing announced on their Instagram account the current production of a new animated Netflix series, titled This World Won't Make Me Evil, featuring the same staff.

Controversy 
Turkish newspaper Sabah wrote an article about the series having the People Defense Units flag in the trailer, as well as flags of the Kurdistan Workers Party displayed in an episode.

See also
List of Italian television series

References

External links
 

2021 animated television series debuts
Animated television series by Netflix
Italian adult animated television series
Italian-language Netflix original programming
Television shows based on comics